Eugène Cremmer (7 February 1942, in Paris – 30 October 2019, in Paris) was a French theoretical physicist. He was directeur de recherche at the CNRS working at the École Normale Supérieure. Cremmer was a postdoc at CERN from 1971–72. In 1978, together with Bernard Julia and Joël Scherk, he co-developed 11 dimensional supergravity theory and proposed a mechanism of spontaneous compactification in field theory.

References 

1942 births
2019 deaths
20th-century French physicists
21st-century French physicists
French string theorists
École Normale Supérieure alumni
French National Centre for Scientific Research scientists

People associated with CERN